Ona Baliukonė  (1948–2007) was a Lithuanian poet and painter.

See also
List of Lithuanian painters

References
This article was initially translated from the Lithuanian Wikipedia.

Lithuanian women poets
1948 births
2007 deaths
Burials at Antakalnis Cemetery
Recipients of the Lithuanian National Prize
20th-century Lithuanian painters
20th-century poets
20th-century women writers
20th-century Lithuanian women writers
20th-century Lithuanian writers